The Malaria Journal is a peer-reviewed open access medical journal published by BioMed Central. It was established in 2002 and covers research on malaria and related topics. The editor-in-chief is Marcel Hommel (University of Liverpool).

Abstracting and indexing 
The journal is abstracted and indexed in:

According to the Journal Citation Reports, the journal has a 2014 impact factor of 2.80.

References

External links 
 

Publications established in 2002
Malaria
BioMed Central academic journals
Creative Commons Attribution-licensed journals
Microbiology journals
English-language journals